The 1968 NCAA University Division Swimming and Diving Championships were contested in March 1968 at Karl Michael Pool at Dartmouth College in Hanover, New Hampshire at the 45th annual NCAA-sanctioned swim meet to determine the team and individual national champions of University Division men's collegiate swimming and diving in the United States.

Indiana topped the team standings, the Hoosiers' first title in program history.

Team standings
Note: Top 10 only
(H) = Hosts
Full results

See also
List of college swimming and diving teams

References

NCAA Division I Men's Swimming and Diving Championships
NCAA University Division Swimming And Diving Championships
NCAA University Division Swimming And Diving Championships
NCAA University Division Swimming and Diving Championships